Mandobo, or Kaeti, is a Papuan language of Mandobo District in Boven Digoel Regency, Papua, Indonesia.

Varieties
Ethnologue distinguishes two languages:
Mandobo Bawah, spoken on the Lower Mandobo River
Mandobo Atas, spoken on the Upper Mandobo River

Phonology

Vowels

Consonants

Evolution

Below are some Kaeti reflexes of proto-Trans-New Guinea proposed by Pawley (2012), drawn from McElhanon and Voorhoeve (1970).

Further reading
Jang, Hong-Tae. 2003. Survey report on languages of southeastern foothills in Papua Merauke Regency of Papua, Indonesia. Manuscript.
Lebold, Randy, Ronald Kriens and Yunita Susanto. 2013. A Report on the Bamgi, Kia, and Lower Digul River Language Survey in Papua, Indonesia. SIL International.

References

External links
Mandobo at the Awyu–Ndumut research group at VU University Amsterdam

Languages of western New Guinea
Awyu–Dumut languages